Pseudotragocephala nigropicta is a species of beetle in the family Cerambycidae, and the only species in the genus Pseudotragocephala. It was described by Fairmaire in 1893.

References

Tragocephalini
Beetles described in 1893